Zalog may refer to:

 Zalog (Ljubljana), formerly independent settlement in the eastern part of the capital Ljubljana in central Slovenia
 Zalog, Kranj, small settlement in the hills north of Kranj in the Upper Carniola region of Slovenia
 Zalog, Straža, village in the Municipality of Straža in southeastern Slovenia